Shay Haim Konstantini (born 27 June 1996) is an Israeli professional footballer who plays as a defender for Israeli Premier League side Maccabi Netanya.

Club career

Bnei Yehuda Tel Aviv
Konstantini rose up the ranks of Bnei Yehuda Tel Aviv, finding great success with the under-19 squad in particular. He was called up to the senior squad for the 2014–15 season; they were playing in the second-tier Liga Leumit at the time. He made his senior debut on 13 March 2015, coming on for Ness Zamir in the 70th minute of a 2–1 win against Ironi Tiberias. He made three more appearances that season, while Bnei Yehuda finished first in the league and earnined promotion to the Israeli Premier League. Konstantini then made his Premier League debut on 12 September 2015, playing the first 70 minutes of a 3–1 loss against Maccabi Petah Tikva.

Loan to Hapoel Nazareth Illit
In January 2018, after making only one appearance for Bnei Yehuda, Konstantini was loaned to Hapoel Nazareth Illit until the end of the season.

Beitar Jerusalem
Following the departure of David Keltjens, Beitar Jerusalem signed Konstantini on a three-year deal, paying 400,000 shekel and transferring to Bnei Yehuda the rights for Avishay Cohen.

Maccabi Netanya
In May 2021, Beitar Jerusalem agreed to release Konstantini from the final year of his contract and he joined Maccabi Netanya, signing a three-year deal with an option for another season.

International career
In January 2013, Konstantini was invited by coach Alon Hazan to train with the Israel national under-17 team. In 2016, Konstantini was part of the Israel national under-21 team which competed at the Valeriy Lobanovskyi Memorial Tournament, helping the team reach the final, where they beat Serbia 3–2 to win the tournament.

Honours

Club
 Bnei Yehuda Tel Aviv
Liga Leumit: 2014–15
Toto Cup Leumit: Runners-up 2014–15
Israel State Cup: 2016–17

 Beitar Jerusalem
Israeli Toto Cup: 2019–20

References

External links

 EuroSport profile
 
 SoccerPunter profile

Living people
1996 births
Israeli footballers
Association football defenders
Bnei Yehuda Tel Aviv F.C. players
Hapoel Nof HaGalil F.C. players
Beitar Jerusalem F.C. players
Maccabi Netanya F.C. players
Liga Leumit players
Israeli Premier League players
Footballers from Holon
Israel under-21 international footballers